The West Winds Motel is a historic motel located on old U.S. Route 66 in Erick, Oklahoma. The motel opened in the mid-1940s to serve travelers on Route 66; at the time, tourism drove Erick's economy, and the motel was one of several in the city. The motel had a typical motor court layout with two lodging buildings and an office forming a "U" shape around a central courtyard. The lodging buildings have a Mission Revival design with stucco walls and red metal roofs designed to resemble tile. The motel units have individual garage spaces in front of their entrances, a style which was common in the 1930s and 1940s but fell out of favor in later years.

The motel was added to the National Register of Historic Places on May 27, 2004.

See also
 List of motels

References

Hotel buildings on the National Register of Historic Places in Oklahoma
Mission Revival architecture in Oklahoma
Buildings and structures in Beckham County, Oklahoma
U.S. Route 66 in Oklahoma
Buildings and structures on U.S. Route 66
Motels
National Register of Historic Places in Beckham County, Oklahoma